The Henry Clay Frick House was the residence of the industrialist and art patron Henry Clay Frick in New York City. The mansion is located between 70th and 71st Street and Fifth Avenue on the Upper East Side of Manhattan. It was constructed in 1912–1914 by Thomas Hastings of Carrère and Hastings. It was transformed into a museum in the mid-1930s and houses the Frick Collection and the Frick Art Reference Library.  The house and library were designated a National Historic Landmark in 2008 for their significance in the arts and architecture as a major repository of a Gilded Age art collection.

History 

After Frick's business partnership with Andrew Carnegie started breaking apart, he began spending less time in Pittsburgh, and soon established additional residences in New York and Massachusetts. In 1905, Frick leased the William H. Vanderbilt House at 640 Fifth Avenue. He and his family stayed there for the next nine years. At that time almost every building on Fifth Avenue above 59th Street was a private mansion, with a few private clubs and a hotel. The Andrew Carnegie Mansion was also located on Fifth Avenue at 91st Street. Whether Frick decided to establish himself on the same avenue because of Carnegie is not definitely established. He started looking for a permanent place to set up residence and became interested in the plot on Fifth Avenue between 70th and 71st Street, that was the site of the Lenox Library. The building housed the private collection of philanthropist James Lenox and was designed by the New York architect Richard Morris Hunt in the neo-Greek style.

The library was suffering financially, which enabled Frick to acquire the plot in the summer of 1906 for $2.47 million. Four months later, he added an additional parcel of land running some fifty feet east through the block. Due to restrictions placed on the use of the library site, Frick could not take title of the land until 1912, when the Lenox collections were incorporated and moved into the New York Public Library's new Main Branch at Fifth Avenue and 42nd Street. The library building was subsequently torn down that year.

Initially Frick sought designs from Daniel Burnham, who was the architect of the Frick Building in downtown Pittsburgh. Burnham submitted a design for an 18th-century Italian palazzo. Ultimately he commissioned architect Thomas Hastings of the firm Carrère and Hastings to design and build his residence. Hastings designed a three-story mansion in the Beaux-Arts architecture. Construction took place between 1912 and 1914. The material used for the exterior and parts of the interior of the mansion is Indiana limestone.

Frick, along with his wife Adelaide Howard Childs (1859–1931) and daughter Helen Clay Frick (1888–1984), moved in during November 1914. The interior was not completed until 1916 and the large art collection moved in. His son Childs Frick (1883–1965) had married Frances Shoemaker Dixon in late 1913, and consequently never resided in the house.

At Frick's death in 1919, he left his house and all of its contents, including art, furniture, and decorative objects, as a museum to the public. His family continued to live in the house until his wife died. Some of the earliest photographic documentation of the interior was taken in 1927 by Frick Art Reference Library photographer Ira W. Martin. Four years after these photographs were taken, on the death of Adelaide Frick, the trustees of the collection began the transformation of the house into a museum. The collection opened to the public in 1935.

Around one-third of the pictures of the collection have been acquired since Frick's death. The building itself has been enlarged three times, in 1931–35, 1977 and 2011, which has altered the original appearance of the house. John Russell Pope converted the former courtyard into the enclosed garden court and demolished the porte-cochère to make way for a public entryway, now known as the entrance hall. Frick's office on the ground floor was also demolished to make way for the oval room. The east gallery and the music room are also later additions.

Architecture  

The house is set apart from Fifth Avenue by an elevated garden on the Fifth Avenue side that has three magnolia trees. The house featured an interior courtyard.

The entrance for visitors is located on 70th Street. The entrance hall has stone walls which are marble-lined and a ceiling carved by the Piccirilli Brothers. The marble staircase with an intricate wrought metal balustrade leads to the second floor, which was private. The first room on the ground floor is the Fragonard room, named for Jean-Honoré Fragonard's large wall paintings. The room is furnished with 18th-century French furniture and Sèvres porcelain. The following room is the living room with the adjacent panelled Georgian architecture library. The west gallery, where some of the most important paintings were hung, is 100 feet long.  Next to it is the enamels room. Adjacent to the west gallery was Frick's office, which faced the courtyard. The British decorator Charles Allom of White, Allom & Co. was selected to furnish the rooms on the ground floor. The manufacturer A. H. Davenport and Company provided furniture and interior woodwork, fabrics, wall coverings and decorative paintings.

With the exception of the Fragonard room, the house remained essentially unchanged from the time of its construction until 1931, the year Adelaide Frick died.

The second floor were the private apartments of the family, such as the bedrooms, the women's boudoir, sitting rooms, the breakfast room and guest rooms. Charles Allom also furnished some rooms on the second floor, including the breakfast room and Frick's personal sitting room. The remaining rooms on the second were decorated by Elsie de Wolfe, who was also commissioned to furnish the ladies' reception room on the first floor, which is now the Boucher room of the museum.

The rooms of the third floor were the servants quarters, which were occupied by around 27 servants. These were also decorated by Elsie de Wolfe. The second and third floors are now used by the museum staff and are not normally accessible to the general public.

The large basement was where the kitchen and service areas were located. A wing contained the billiard room and bowling alley. These spaces were decorated in the Jacobean style with ornate strapwork ceilings. During the 1920s and early 1930s, the Frick Art Reference Library was housed here until they moved to a new structure next door at 10 East 71st Street.

In popular culture
According to Stan Lee, who co-created the superhero team Avengers, the house was the model for the Avengers Mansion.

See also
List of National Historic Landmarks in New York City
List of New York City Designated Landmarks in Manhattan from 59th to 110th Streets
National Register of Historic Places listings in Manhattan from 59th to 110th Streets

References

Further reading

External links

 

Houses in Manhattan
Fifth Avenue
Historic house museums in New York City
Houses completed in 1914
Houses on the National Register of Historic Places in Manhattan
National Historic Landmarks in Manhattan
New York City Designated Landmarks in Manhattan
Upper East Side
Carrère and Hastings buildings
Beaux-Arts architecture in New York City
Gilded Age mansions
1914 establishments in New York City